Elizabeth Spencer, Duchess of Marlborough ( – 7 October 1761), formerly the Hon. Elizabeth Trevor, was the wife of Charles Spencer, 3rd Duke of Marlborough.

Early life
She was the daughter of Thomas Trevor, 2nd Baron Trevor of Bromham, Bedfordshire.  Her paternal grandparents were the former Elizabeth Searle and Thomas Trevor, 1st Baron Trevor, a Chief Justice of the Common Pleas and Lord President of the Council.

Personal life
She married Charles Spencer, then Earl of Sunderland on 23 May 1732, becoming Countess of Sunderland. The Earl's grandmother, Sarah, Dowager Duchess of Marlborough, disapproved of the marriage because Elizabeth's grandfather, the 1st Baron Trevor, had been a political opponent. The dowager commented that "she has very bad teeth, which I think is an objection alone in a wife, and they will be sure to grow worse with time." Elizabeth became a duchess in the following year when her husband inherited the dukedom. Together, they had five children:

 Lady Diana Spencer (1734–1808), who married Frederick St John, 2nd Viscount Bolingbroke. After his death, she married Topham Beauclerk, and had children from both marriages.
 Elizabeth Herbert, Countess of Pembroke and Montgomery (1737–1831), who married Henry Herbert, 10th Earl of Pembroke, and had children.
 George Spencer, 4th Duke of Marlborough (1739–1817).
 Lord Charles Spencer (1740–1820), who married Hon. Mary Beauclerk, and had children.
 Lord Robert Spencer (1747–1831), who married Henrietta Bouverie.

She also acted as godmother to George John Spencer, 2nd Earl Spencer in 1758.

The couple lived at a lodge in the "Little Park" at Windsor, by the permission of Sarah Churchill, but the dowager was unhappy with the alterations made by the new duke, and forced them to move out in 1737, replacing them with Charles's younger brother John and his new wife.

Legacy
Her portrait, by Jean-Baptiste Van Loo, hangs in Blenheim Palace.

References

External links

Portrait of Elizabeth, Duchess of Marlborough, attributed to Maria Verelst

1710s births
1761 deaths
Daughters of barons
English duchesses by marriage